The Women's 100 metres T34 event at the 2012 Summer Paralympics took place at the London Olympic Stadium on 31 August.

Results

Round 1
Competed 31 August 2012 from 12:30. Qual. rule: first 3 in each heat (Q) plus the 2 fastest other times (q) qualified.

Heat 1

Heat 2

Final
Competed 31 August 2012 at 20:00.

 
Q = qualified by place. q = qualified by time. WRC = World Record for athlete's classification. PR = Paralympic Record. PRC = Paralympic Record for athlete's classification. RR = Regional Record.

References

Athletics at the 2012 Summer Paralympics
2012 in women's athletics
Women's sport in London